The 2016 Dalian Yifang F.C. season was the seventh season in club history.

Background
Before the season, Yifang announced that Mikael Stahre will continue his job. The team and the manager himself claimed that the team will try to gain promotion into the 2017 Chinese Super League.

In July 2016, Yifang made changes of critical personnel including chairman and technical staffs, replacing their manager Mikael Stahre with Milinko Pantić from Atletico Madrid B, and signed Lin Lefeng as the chairman, hoping to improve their performance, but it failed. After just 8 matches, Pantić was replaced with Sergio Piernas Cárdenas, his assistant coach.

Kits

Friendlies

Preseason

China League One

League table

Dalian Derby
Yifang had experienced local derby back in the 2012 season against Dalian Shide, in the Chinese Super League. However, Shide was disbanded after the 2012 season. In this season, Yifang saw chances to compete with an alternate local team Dalian Transcendence. Yifang won by 2–0 in the first leg, but lost by 1–2 later.

Results summary

League fixtures and results

Chinese FA Cup

FA Cup fixtures and results

Player information

Transfers

In

Out

Squad

Appearances and Goals

Goalscorers

Assists

References

Dalian Professional F.C. seasons
Dalian Yifang F.C.